Havarlı, also Gavarly ( Havarikʿ or Havarik) is a village and municipality in the Yevlakh Rayon of Azerbaijan. It has a population of 3,362. The municipality consists of the villages of Havarlı and Əxşam.

Notable natives 

 Malik Asadov — National Hero of Azerbaijan.

References 

Populated places in Yevlakh District